The 2003 Atlantic Coast Conference baseball tournament was held at the Salem Memorial Baseball Stadium in Salem, Virginia, from May 20 through 25.  Georgia Tech won the tournament, in large part by winning three games on the final day of the event, and earned the Atlantic Coast Conference's automatic bid to the 2003 NCAA Division I baseball tournament.

Tournament

Play-In Game
The two teams with the worst records in regular season conference play faced each other in a single elimination situation to earn the 8th spot in the conference tournament.

Main Bracket

Seeding Procedure
From TheACC.com:
On Saturday (The Semifinals) of the ACC Baseball Tournament, the match-up between the four remaining teams is determined by previous opponents. If teams have played previously in the tournament, every attempt will be made to avoid a repeat match-up between teams, regardless of seed. If it is impossible to avoid a match-up that already occurred, then the determination is based on avoiding the most recent, current tournament match-up, regardless of seed. If no match-ups have occurred, the team left in the winners bracket will play the lowest seeded team from the losers bracket.

Bracket

All-Tournament Team

(*)Denotes Unanimous Selection

See also
College World Series
NCAA Division I Baseball Championship

References

TheACC.com 2003 Baseball Championship Info

Tournament
Atlantic Coast Conference baseball tournament
Atlantic Coast Conference baseball tournament
Atlantic Coast Conference baseball tournament
Baseball competitions in Salem, Virginia
College baseball tournaments in Virginia